Patrick John Grady (born 5 February 1980) is a Scottish politician.
He was elected at the 2015 UK general election as the Member of Parliament (MP) for Glasgow North. He was re-elected for the same constituency in the 2017 general election and in the 2019 general election.

On 26 June 2022, he temporarily suspended his membership of the Scottish National Party (SNP), sitting as an independent MP until 29 December 2022 when Grady's whip was restored.

Early life
Grady was born in Edinburgh, Scotland. He was brought up in Inverness and was educated at Inverness Royal Academy, before attending the University of Strathclyde. Between 2011 and 2015, he worked as an advocacy manager for the Scottish Catholic International Aid Fund, and has also lived and worked in London and Malawi.

Political career
After joining the Scottish National Party in 1997, aged seventeen, Grady stood at the 2010 general election as the SNP candidate for Glasgow North. In 2012, he was elected as National Secretary of the SNP until he stood down in 2016. He headed the "Yes" campaign in the Kelvin area of Glasgow during the 2014 referendum on Scottish independence.

After being elected to the House of Commons, Grady was appointed as SNP Westminster Spokesperson on International Development and was a member of the House of Commons Procedure Committee until the 2017 election. Like several SNP MPs and MSPs, he also holds membership of Plaid Cymru, although this has no formal effect in the House of Commons. After the 2017 election, he was appointed as Chief Whip of the SNP Westminster Group, and was re-appointed to this role after the 2019 election.

In March 2021, Grady stood aside from his position as Chief Whip following the SNP confirming it had received a complaint of sexual misconduct by an SNP staff member.

Recipient of offensive communications
In December 2021, a woman was convicted of an offence under section 127 of the Communications Act 2003 after a sheriff determined that emails that she sent to Grady in February 2021 were grossly offensive.

Announcement of Prime Minister's Resignation in the House of Commons
On 20 October 2022, Liz Truss announced her decision to resign as Prime Minister while Business Questions was underway in the House of Commons.  Grady was the first Member of Parliament to reference this decision, which was not directly acknowledged by the Leader of the House, Penny Mordaunt.

Sexual misconduct allegations
In March 2021, newspapers reported that an anonymous letter sent to the House of Commons Speaker John Bercow in 2017 claimed "A member of staff recently left the SNP who was groped sexually by Patrick Grady at last year's Christmas Party.  There was another male staff member who was groped sexually by Mr Grady the same night of last year".

Scottish Conservative MP John Lamont wrote to SNP Westminster Leader Ian Blackford in 2021 urging him to explain why no action was taken after sexual harassment allegations were made against Grady four years earlier, and why the party had not suspended him whilst the investigation was underway.

In April 2021, Nicola Sturgeon confirmed that she was aware of a concern about Grady before a misconduct complaint was made against him. On 16 April, a story appeared in The Times stating that the alleged sexual harassment complaint against Grady had been upheld. He allegedly "inappropriately" touched an SNP male staff member, then aged 19, in a London pub. The alleged victim was then in a meeting with Blackford and Grady regarding the matter, which the alleged victim described as an "ambush".

In June 2022, the Commissioner for Standards concluded Grady had breached sexual misconduct policy upholding a complaint that he had made "an unwanted sexual advance" to a junior member of staff by stroking their hair, neck and back. The report stated "The distinction in age, status and authority between him and the respondent is obvious and forms a key aggravating factor in the case." In the same month, a report from the Independent Expert Panel published advice that Grady should be suspended from the House of Commons.

On 26 June 2022 it was announced that the Metropolitan Police had received an allegation against him of sexual assault.  The SNP announced that he would step away from his party membership while this matter was dealt with. On 3 July 2022, the Metropolitan Police announced that following discussions with the staff member, they would take no further action.

References

External links 

 
 
 SNP profile
 

|-

1980 births
Alumni of the University of Strathclyde
Living people
Members of the Parliament of the United Kingdom for Glasgow constituencies
People educated at Inverness Royal Academy
Politicians from Edinburgh
People from Inverness
Scottish National Party MPs
UK MPs 2015–2017
UK MPs 2017–2019
UK MPs 2019–present
Scottish Roman Catholics